Silmsi is a village in Järva Parish, Järva County in northern Estonia.

References

 

Villages in Järva County